Linares Club de Fútbol was a Spanish football club based in Linares, Jaén, in the autonomous community of Andalusia. Founded in 1961 it disappeared 29 years later due to serious economic problems, and held home matches at Estadio de Linarejos, with a 10,000-seat capacity.

History
Founded in 1961, Linares reached the national leagues four years later. It would eventually play five seasons in the second division, four of those consecutive (1980–84), never finishing higher than 12th. From 1962–67, the club competed under the name Santana Linares Club de Fútbol.

After being relegated in the 1983–84 season, Linares played five out of its last six years in Segunda División B – created in 1977 as the new third level. Following the team's disappearance another club was founded in the city, CD Linares: in its 19 years of existence it appeared in seven seasons in the fourth division and eight in the third (seven consecutive), before folding in 2009.

Seasons

5 seasons in Segunda División
8 seasons in Segunda División B
11 seasons in Tercera División (10 as third tier, 1 as fourth tier)
4 seasons in Categorías Regionales

Famous players

 
Defunct football clubs in Andalusia
Association football clubs established in 1960
Association football clubs disestablished in 1990
1960 establishments in Spain
1990 disestablishments in Spain
Linares, Jaén
Segunda División clubs